Kristian Svensson (born 10 May 1981) is a Swedish handball coach and former handball player. He is currently assistant coach for IFK Skövde.

References

External links
 Kristian Svensson at IFK Skövde's webpage

1981 births
Living people
Swedish male handball players